Tala Hydroelectric Power Station is a run-of-the-river type hydroelectric power station on the Wangchu River in Chukha District, Bhutan.

Preliminary construction on the project began in 1997 and major works were underway by 1999. The power equipments viz. turbines, generators etc. were designed and manufactured by Bharat Heavy Electricals Limited (BHEL), at their various factories in India. The first generator was commissioned on 31 July 2006 and the final on 30 March 2007. The project cost was about US$900 million and was financed by India through grants. All of the electricity generated is exported to India through three 400kV transmission lines.

The power station is the country's biggest hydropower project and the fourth after the Chuka project (336 MW) in 1988, followed by Kurichhu (60 MW) in 2001, and Basochho (40 MW) in 2005. Electricity revenue was expected to provide no less than 60% of the government's entire revenue in 2009. In 2017, 97.7% of Bhutanese households had access to electricity.

See also

 Raidāk River

References 

Dams completed in 2006
Energy infrastructure completed in 2006
Energy infrastructure completed in 2007
Hydroelectric power stations in Bhutan
Bhutan–India relations
Dams in Bhutan
Run-of-the-river power stations
Economy of Bhutan
2007 establishments in Bhutan